Live and Unleashed is the first live album by American progressive rock/AOR band Pavlov's Dog, released in 2011.

The album was recorded during the band's 2009 European Tour, wιth Pavlov's Dog performing songs from their previously released albums, their then upcoming album Echo & Boo, David Surkamp's solo work Dancing on the Edge of a Teacup, as well as one song from Hi-Fi's EP Demonstration Record. During the introduction of the song "Breaking Ice" David Surkamp states that Pavlov's Dog dedicate the tour to the memory of their original violinist Siegfried Carver who died on May 30, 2009.

Several bootleg recordings of Pavlov's Dog past live performances had been circulating years before the release of Live and Unleashed, with the most popular one being Live In Detroit 1976. However, Live and Unleashed is confirmed to be their first officially released live recording.

Track listing
All tracks credited to David Surkamp, except where noted.

Personnel
All information according to the album's liner notes

Pavlov's Dog
David Surkamp: lead vocals, guitar, mandolin
Mike Safron: drums, backing vocals
Abbie Hainz: violin, backing vocals, mandolin
Sara Surkamp: vocals, guitar, percussion
Bill Franco: guitar
Nicholas Schlueter: keyboards, backing vocals
Rick Steiling: bass guitar

Production
Manfred Ploetz: producer
Stefan Pfaender : mastering

Artwork
Sara Surkamp: art direction
Photos by www.satipics.com and www.bcphoto.co.uk

References

2011 live albums
Pavlov's Dog (band) albums